This was the first edition of the tournament, which was primarily organized to compensate for the cancellation of Asian tournaments in 2021 due to the COVID-19 pandemic.

Joe Salisbury and Neal Skupski won the title, defeating John Peers and Filip Polášek in the final, 7–6(7–2), 3–6, [10–5].

Seeds

Draw

Draw

References

External links
Main Draw

2021 ATP Tour